Donald William Cody (born March 28, 1936) is a business owner and former political figure in Saskatchewan. He represented Watrous from 1971 to 1975 and Kinistino from 1978 to 1982 in the Legislative Assembly of Saskatchewan as a New Democratic Party (NDP) member

He was born in Pilger, Saskatchewan, the son of Edward Cody and Rosella Wirtz, and was educated there. Cody then worked as a telegraph operator for the Canadian Pacific Railway. In 1961, he married Joan Eileen Germsheid. From 1963 to 1967, he worked as a claims adjuster for Saskatchewan Government Insurance in Regina. Then, Cody was claims examiner and Saskatchewan claims supervisor for Co-op Insurance Services Ltd.

Cody was defeated by John Gary Lane when he ran for the Qu'Appelle seat in the provincial assembly in 1975. He served in the Saskatchewan cabinet as Minister of Co-operation and Co-operative Development and as Minister of Telephones. He was defeated by Bernard Boutin when he ran for reelection to the provincial assembly in 1982.

After leaving politics, Cody moved to Prince Albert, where he became the owner of Buns Master Bakery. From 1994 to 2003, he was mayor of Prince Albert. He also served as chair of the board for Saskatchewan Government Insurance.

The former mayor of Prince Albert is also known for his drinking and driving conviction. Cody was arrested March 26, 2003, at his house for being suspected of impaired driving. The police did not immediately charge Mr. Cody which ultimately led to accusations of a cover up.  During the trial, the courts heard that he had been pulled over and two constables took him to the police station for a breath sample. Of note was the sample wasn't taken and he was instead driven to the home of then- police chief John Quinn.

Cody was only charged after police from Regina were called in to investigate. Mr. Cody testified during his trial that he had been drinking that day, but wasn't impaired.  As a result the former chief Quinn and two senior officers were suspended immediately after the case became public. Mr. Quinn later resigned. The officers, Staff Sergeant Kelly Liebrecht and Inspector Norm Bergen, each faced a charge of obstruction, as well as a combined 15 charges under the Police Act.

Cody held the mayor's seat from 1994 to October 2003.

Currently, Cody serves as the elected Councillor for Prince Albert Ward 4.

Electoral history

|-
 
|style="width: 130px"|NDP
|Don W. Cody
|align="right"|3,318
|align="right"|52.71%
|align="right"|+7.94

 
|Prog. Conservative
|Jack B. Pearce
|align="right"|425
|align="right"|6.75%
|align="right"|-2.58
|- bgcolor="white"
!align="left" colspan=3|Total
!align="right"|6,295
!align="right"|100.00%
!align="right"|

|-
 
|style="width: 130px"|NDP
|Donald Cody
|align="right"|4,042
|align="right"|54.55%
|align="right"|+10.34
 
|Progressive Conservative
|Louis A. Domotor
|align="right"|2,661
|align="right"|35.92%
|align="right"|+13.13

|- bgcolor="white"
!align="left" colspan=3|Total
!align="right"|7,409
!align="right"|100.00%
!align="right"|

|-
 
|style="width: 130px"|Progressive Conservative
|Bernard Boutin
|align="right"|4,266
|align="right"|51.57%
|align="right"|+15.65
 
|NDP
|Donald Cody
|align="right"|3,759
|align="right"|45.44%
|align="right"|-9.11

|- bgcolor="white"
!align="left" colspan=3|Total
!align="right"|8,272
!align="right"|100.00%
!align="right"|

|-
 
|style="width: 130px"|Progressive Conservative
|Joe Saxinger
|align="right"|3,900
|align="right"|49.11%
|align="right"|-2.46
 
|NDP
|Don Cody
|align="right"|3,748
|align="right"|47.20%
|align="right"|+1.76

|- bgcolor="white"
!align="left" colspan=3|Total
!align="right"|7,941
!align="right"|100.00%
!align="right"|

References 

Saskatchewan New Democratic Party MLAs
1936 births
Living people
Mayors of Prince Albert, Saskatchewan
Members of the Executive Council of Saskatchewan
21st-century Canadian legislators
20th-century Canadian legislators